Paolo Scaramuzza (born 27 February 1959) is an Italian bobsledder. He competed at the 1984 Winter Olympics and the 1988 Winter Olympics.

References

1959 births
Living people
Sportspeople from the Province of Parma
Italian male bobsledders
Olympic bobsledders of Italy
Bobsledders at the 1984 Winter Olympics
Bobsledders at the 1988 Winter Olympics